Topten is a South Korean clothing brand operated by Shinsung Tongsang.

References

External links
 

Clothing brands of South Korea